Dactylagnus is a genus of sand stargazers, found in the eastern central Pacific and western central Atlantic Ocean.

Species
There are currently three recognized species in this genus:
 Dactylagnus mundus T. N. Gill, 1863 (Giant sand stargazer)
 Dactylagnus parvus C. E. Dawson, 1976 (Panamic stargazer)
 Dactylagnus peratikos  J. E. Böhlke & D. K. Caldwell, 1961

References

 
Dactyloscopidae
Marine fish genera
Taxa named by Theodore Gill